The Second Midland School is a former school in Colorado Springs. Built in 1902, it was added to the National Register of Historic Places (NRHP) on September 12, 1980. The building is three stories tall and is made of red sandstone and brick.

The school property was purchased by L Ducett to be used as an office building.

The building was fully renovated with assistance of 25 High School students and localcraftsmen. The existing school rooms (including restrooms and the stage and library) blackboards and flagpole were all retained and used. 

The Eskanos later sold the property to a group that planned to convert it into a Catholic grade school .

References

School buildings on the National Register of Historic Places in Colorado
Colorado State Register of Historic Properties
Buildings and structures in Colorado Springs, Colorado
National Register of Historic Places in Colorado Springs, Colorado